Christine. Perfekt war gestern! is a German television sitcom first aired on 22 August 2013 on RTL. It is an adaptation of the American series The New Adventures of Old Christine.

Premise 
Christine is a thirty-something, single mom. She still has a good relationship to her former husband Stefan. Then she meets his new girlfriend whose name is also Christine. So she becomes the “old Christine” and starts looking for a new boyfriend for herself.

Cast 
 Diana Amft as Christine Wagner
 Janek Rieke as Stefan Wagner
 Anna Julia Kapfelsperger as the “new” Christine
 Carl Wegelein as Tom Wagner
 Elisabeth Baulitz as Franziska Lüttich
 Brigitte Zeh as Caro von Wiese
 Axel Schreiber as Mark
 Minh-Khai Phan-Thi as Betty

Production 
Christine. Perfekt war gestern! is an adaption of the American sitcom The New Adventures of Old Christine starring Julia Louis-Dreyfus. Some dialogs of the original were just translated and put in the German version. Production took place from  20 November 2012 to 25 January 2013 in Berlin. On 24 October 2013 it was announced that there is not going to be a second season of the show.

Episodes

Season 1 (2013)

References

External links
 

German comedy television series
2013 German television series debuts
2013 German television series endings
RTL (German TV channel) original programming
German-language television shows
German television series based on American television series